Patrick Martin Hall  (14 March 1894 – 5 August 1941) was an English first-class cricketer who played as a right-handed batsman.

Hall made his debut for Oxford University in 1919 against the Free Foresters, where on debut Hall made his maiden and only century with a score of 101. Hall played a further two matches for the university, both coming in the 1919 season against Sussex and Surrey.

In the same season Hall made his debut for Hampshire in the County Championship against Sussex. From 1919 to 1926 Hall played infrequently for Hampshire, playing a total of eleven first-class matches. Hall's final first-class match for the county came against Somerset in the 1926 County Championship. In his eleven matches for the county, Hall scored 164 runs at a batting average of 10.25, with one half century and a high score of 94* against Lancashire in 1920.

During the First World War Hall served with the Royal Field Artillery and was awarded the Military Cross. He was a botanist and edited the Botanical Society and Exchange Club's Report 1936–41. He died at Fareham, Hampshire, on 5 August 1941.

Family
Hall's father Ernest Hall also represented Hampshire in eleven first-class matches.

References

External links

Patrick Hall at Cricinfo
Patrick Hall at CricketArchive

1894 births
1941 deaths
Cricketers from Portsmouth
English cricketers
Oxford University cricketers
Hampshire cricketers
Alumni of Oriel College, Oxford
English botanists
Royal Field Artillery officers
British Army personnel of World War I